Majlinda Nana Rama  is an Albanian pedagogue, writer and researcher. She is considered the most prominent representative of her literary generation and one of the honored names of today's Albanian literature. She has written poetry, essays, scientific articles, studies, literary criticism, novels, short stories, etc. She is a lecturer at the University of Arts, Tirana.

Life and work 
Majlinda Nana Rama was born in Tepelena. In her hometown she received his primary and secondary education. During the years 1998–2002, she completed higher studies in Albanian Literature and Language, (Tirana). In 2012, she graduated from the Faculty of Political Science with a degree in International Relations. In 2014 she received the title of Master of Science in Political and Legal Sciences. She has worked as an administrator of "SHSSH" and as a teacher of Albanian Language and Literature. Since 2004 She has been working in several media. Since 2006 and is currently a journalist for the national newspaper "Panorama". She has been the director of the Information Department at the "Apollon" television. She has also worked as a journalist for "Ora News" television, TV "Klan"television and "Abc News" television. She is the author, screenwriter, and show manager for social, cultural, and political. She works in the Municipality of Fier and is the executive director of the Cultural Foundation "Harpa". She is the founder and director of the National Book Fair "Fieri". She is classified as one of the most influential people in the world. Is a member of the WPS (League of Contemporary Poets of the Globe).
As a writer, Majlinda Rama became famous with the novel "Emperors", which resonated greatly due to the sharp theme, treatment and fable fusion. This novel, which paved the way for literature, would soon become a film in Switzerland. Majlinda Rama's special style immediately caught the eye of the most famous critics and scholars of the time, who saw in the young writer a talent prominent. "In Albania, Kadare will not be left alone", they would say about her.
Her versatile talent comes through colors, situations, characters, problems, in different genres, from lyrics to epics, from love to drama, from drama to tragedy, all with an adorable creative culture. In 2019, Majlinda Rama was included in the study column of academician Ali Aliu on the work of the best contemporary authors, alongside well-known writers, Ismail Kadare, Dritëro Agolli, Fatos Arapi, Azem Shkreli, Zija Çela and Kim Mehmeti. Her literature has been promoted and translated in several countries, such as: Kosovo, Macedonia, Montenegro, Germany, France, Switzerland, Austria, Belgium, Poland, the Netherlands, Hungary, Spain, etc. The foreign press has compared him to Dostoevsky, A. Chekhov and Alexander Griboyedov.

Bibliography 
 Take me tear hostage - (Poetry) - 2004;
 Moon of my sky - (Poetry) - 2006;
 But the trial continues- (Essay) - 2006;
 Emperors - novel - 2014;
 Literary Criticism - studies, criticism, essays, journalism, Skopje, 2014;
 The Lady in Red  - novel, 2015;
 The polycentric logic of a new state - studies, 2016;
 Defined concept of an economic model - studies, 2016;
 Escape - novel, 2016;
 Anthology of poetic prose - 2017;
 Return - novel, 2017;
 Wild Flowers - poetry, Skopje, 2017;
 Poetic code of Agoll - monography, 2018;
 Moving messages (On the poetry of Ali Podrimja) - monography, 2018;
 Arzoe - Novel, 2019;
 Literary Notes - Studies, literary criticism, 2019;
 Lyric with pain - poetry, Onufri, 2020.

Prizes 
 Finalist of the National Prize for Literature awarded by the Ministry of Culture, Albania, (2020);
 International Award "Woman 2019" awarded by Universum Academy, Switzerland;
 Finalist of the "Kadare Award" (2018);
 Award "Best Poetic Book" ("Wild Flowers") given at the XX International Fair of Prishtina (2017);
 First Prize in Macedonia awarded by the Ministry of Culture, Macedonia (poetry);
 "Faik Konica" Award for Best Literary Criticism;
 She was declared "Ambassador of Peace", Tirana, Albania;
 "Naim Frashëri" Award, given at the Albanological Institute, Prishtina;
 "Esad Mekuli" Award, given to the National Library in Kosovo;
 “Mountains Hour” Award, given in Rozaje, Montenegro;
 “Poetic Muse” Award, given in Mat, Albania;
 She was announced "Man of the Year" in 2014, Tirana, Albania;
 Award "Poetic Muse 2012", given in Tirana, Albania.

References 
 :sq:Majlinda Nana Rama
 :bg:Майлинда Рама
 
 
 
 

 
 

 
 
 
 
 

Albanian writers
Academic staff of the University of Arts, Tirana
Albanian poets
1980 births
Living people